Maruxa Pita (born March 18, 1930) is a Spanish missionary and a former teacher who helped to establish the Institucion Teresiana School now known as Saint Pedro Poveda College in Quezon City. In 1995, she established the Makabata School Foundation, Inc. in Pasig to help less fortunate Filipino children to study for free.

Early life 

Maruxa was born in Madrid in 1930. Her father's name was Antonino Pita and her 3 sisters: Carmen, Chita and Isabel. At the age of 17 she followed her older sister Chita and joined the Teresian Association that was founded by Father Pedro Poveda.

In the Philippines 

She arrived in the Philippines in 1959 to help establish the Institucion Teresiana School now known as Saint Pedro Poveda College in Quezon City. She served as school principal from 1965 to 1973. She then taught Spanish at both the University of Santo Tomas from 1973 to 1979 and the Spanish Cultural Center from 1975 to 1979. She also worked as director of the Spanish Cultural Center where she organized all the teaching areas and managed the Spanish teachers from 1979 to 1993. In 1993, the Instituto Cervantes of Manila was established and she stayed as the academic head of the center. It was the first Cervantes established in Asia. The Instituto Cervantes gave a tribute to the tireless and outstanding teacher honoring her work in Spanish language in the Philippines and her dedication and commitment to help educate underprivileged children with her foundation.

Trivia 

At that time, Institucion Teresiana pre-school was co-ed. Maruxa recalls that she taught the four older children of Senator Benigno Aquino Jr. and President Corazon Aquino, who included current President Benigno Aquino III. She says that "They were all together in school".

Awards and recognition 

 The Blessed Teresa of Calcutta Award (2011)
 People’s Choice Award (2012)

References

External links 
 Makabata School Foundation

1930 births
Living people
People from Madrid
Spanish educators
Spanish women educators
Spanish Roman Catholic missionaries
Spanish expatriates in the Philippines
Roman Catholic missionaries in the Philippines
Missionary educators